Antoni Szałowski (21 April 1907, in Warsaw – 21 March 1973, in Paris) was a Polish composer. In his youth he studied violin but soon became more interested in piano, conducting, and composition. Szałowski studied with Paweł Lewiecki and Kazimierz Sikorski at the Warsaw Conservatoire. In 1930 he received a government grant which enabled him to study in Paris. He was a student of Nadia Boulanger at the École Normale de Musique de Paris. He composed three string quartets; his later Overture for Orchestra (1936) was his first well-known work. During the occupation of Poland by Nazi Germany in World War II he lived in hiding and with financial difficulties, and was sought by the Nazis, but managed to compose several works. Most of his works were written for strings. Szałowski suffered a heart attack and died shortly after trying to lift his wife after she slipped and fell.  Szałowski is mostly known today for his Sonatina for Clarinet (1936) and other chamber wind pieces, with occasional performances of his Overture.

References
 Maciejewski, B.M. Twelve Polish Composers
 
 
 

1907 births
1973 deaths
20th-century composers
Polish composers
École Normale de Musique de Paris alumni
Polish emigrants to France